Aleksandar Đorđević (born 21 July 1981) is an Austrian footballer who currently plays for FC Wolfurt.

References

External links
 

1981 births
Living people
Austrian footballers
SV Horn players
First Vienna FC players
Wiener Sport-Club players
SC Schwanenstadt players
SC Austria Lustenau players
2. Liga (Austria) players
People from Bregenz
Association football midfielders
Footballers from Vorarlberg